A recording of transmission (ROT) is a record made of material broadcast on a radio station. ROTs were usually made on videotapes that can record up to eight hours at a time. These days recordings are often made on hard disk by software, or dedicated hardware.

UK law
By United Kingdom law, every radio station must record everything it broadcasts and retain the recordings for 42 days (approximately 1,000 hours) should a complaint be made about something the station has broadcast.

Broadcasting